Coahuayutla de Guerrero is a city and seat of the municipality of Coahuayutla de José María Izazaga, in the state of Guerrero, south-western Mexico. In 2005, the population of Coahuayutla de Guerrero was 1,373.

References

Populated places in Guerrero